Kazuya Otani is a Grand Prix motorcycle racer from Japan.

Career statistics

By season

Races by year
(key)

References

http://www.motogp.com/en/riders/Kazuya+Otani

Japanese motorcycle racers
1989 births
Living people
125cc World Championship riders